Charles XII's Courier (Swedish: Carl XII:s kurir) is a 1924 Swedish silent historical adventure film directed by Rudolf Anthoni and starring Gösta Ekman, Renée Björling and Nils Asther. It was shot at the Råsunda Studios in Stockholm. The film's sets were designed by the art director Vilhelm Bryde. It is now considered to be a lost film. It should not be confused with the 1925 film Charles XII in which Ekman also starred, appearing in the title role.

Synopsis
Following his  defeat at Bender, Charles XII sends one of his officers carrying vital messages to Stockholm across a hostile and dangerous Europe.

Cast
 Gösta Ekman as Axel Roos
 Tottan Skantze as 	Maria Sobieska
 Renée Björling as Anna Björnhufvud
 Hilda Castegren as Aurora Sobieska
 Victor Lundberg as 	Alexis Potocki
 Nils Asther as Stanislaus
 Nils Lundell as 	Man

References

Bibliography
 Gustafsson, Tommy. Masculinity in the Golden Age of Swedish Cinema: A Cultural Analysis of 1920s Films. McFarland, 2014..

External links

1924 films
1924 adventure films
1920s historical adventure films
Swedish silent feature films
Swedish black-and-white films
1920s Swedish-language films
Swedish historical adventure films
Films set in the 18th century
Silent historical adventure films
1920s Swedish films